Backbone Mountain is a ridge of the Allegheny Mountains of the central Appalachian Mountain Range. It is situated in the U.S. states of West Virginia and Maryland and forms a portion of the Eastern Continental Divide.

Description and geography

The Eastern Continental Divide follows part of the mountain in Maryland. The headwaters of Youghiogheny River, in the watershed of the Mississippi River, lie just northwest of the mountain, whereas the headwaters of the North Branch of the Potomac River lie just south of the mountain, along the West Virginia-Maryland border.  In West Virginia, the Eastern Continental Divide diverts to the east, with both sides of the mountain draining into the Black Fork.

The ridge is crossed twice by U.S. Route 219, once north of Parsons and again near Silver Lake.  It is also crossed by U.S. Route 50 east of Red House, Maryland, which is marked by a Maryland State Highway Administration sign.

Notable features

Hoye-Crest

Located just inside of Maryland along Backbone Mountain is Hoye-Crest. The location, named for Captain Charles Hoye, founder of the Garrett County Historical Society, has a marker and offers a view of the North Branch Potomac River valley to the east. The location is accessible via a path leading from U.S. Route 219 to the west.

Olson Observation Tower

The southern end of Backbone Mountain was the location of West Virginia's first fire tower.  The first tower was built in 1922 by the state and subsequently transferred to Monongahela National Forest.  In 1963, the original tower was replaced with the one currently on-site and named after Ernest B. Olson in recognition of 28 years of service in MNF fire control and conservation programs.

While the cab of the tower is not open to the public, the 133 steps leading to it are.  From the tower it is possible to view the surrounding area, including Cheat River watershed, Parsons, Blackwater Canyon, Canaan Mountain and the Otter Creek Wilderness.

Crabtree Woods
Crabtree Woods, on the northwest slopes of Backbone Mountain, is in the Potomac-Garrett State Forest.

See also

Outline of Maryland
Index of Maryland-related articles
Blackwater Canyon
List of U.S. states by elevation
Monongahela National Forest

References

External links
 
 

Ridges of Maryland
Ridges of West Virginia
Landforms of Garrett County, Maryland
Landforms of Preston County, West Virginia
Landforms of Tucker County, West Virginia
Monongahela National Forest